Garfi is a surname used in several countries, especially Tunisia. Notable people with the surname include:

 Elyes Garfi (born 1993), Tunisian volleyball player

See also
 Garfit

Surnames of Tunisian origin